Rose Quigley is a former camogie player, captain of the Louth team that went to two All Ireland finals in 1934 and 1936.

Family
Her two daughters Susan and Collette subsequently played for Louth.

References

External links
 Camogie.ie Official Camogie Association Website
 Wikipedia List of Camogie players

Louth camogie players
Year of birth missing
Possibly living people